Yusha may refer to:

Yusha (given name), Arabic form of Joshua
Joshua in Islamic history
Yūsha, or Yuusha (Japanese: 勇者 "hero")
particularly Yūsha, robot toys and anime in the Brave series
 Yuusha, a character in the anime series Endro! 
Yusha, ayurvedic lentil soup in Sattvic diet